George Alhassan (9 September 1941 – 26 July 2013) was a Ghanaian football player. During his playing days he featured for Accra Hearts of Oak between the 1960s to 1970's.

The player participated at the 1968 Olympics in a game against Israel. and a year later he played for Ghana on 10 May 1969 in a 1970 World Cup qualification game. He died on 26 July 2013.

References

External links 
 

Ghanaian footballers
Ghana international footballers
1941 births
2013 deaths
Olympic footballers of Ghana
Footballers at the 1968 Summer Olympics
Association football forwards